Natalia Nikitichna Tolstaya (May 2, 1943, Yelabuga, Tatar ASSR – June 15, 2010, Saint Petersburg) was a Russian writer and translator from the Tolstoy family. She was a granddaughter of writer Alexei Tolstoy and poet Mikhail Lozinsky, and sister of the writer Tatyana Tolstaya. She taught for many years at Saint Petersburg State University, from which she had also graduated.  Tolstaya's specialty was Scandinavian languages, and she wrote her first stories in Swedish before turning to Russian. In 2004 she was awarded the Order of the Polar Star by the Swedish government for her efforts in fostering better relations between Russia and Sweden.

References
Obituary in English
Obituary (in Russian)

1943 births
2010 deaths
People from Yelabuga
Russian writers
Soviet writers
Scandinavian studies scholars
Soviet translators
Saint Petersburg State University alumni
Academic staff of Saint Petersburg State University
Order of the Polar Star
Natalia
20th-century Russian translators
Russian women writers
20th-century women writers
20th-century Russian women